Bezirk Lothringen (today's , at the time translated into  i.e. Department of Lorraine), also called German Lorraine (Deutsch Lothringen), was a government region ("Bezirk") in the western part of Alsace-Lorraine when it was part of the German Empire from 1871 to 1918.

History 
The Department of Lorraine was unlike Prussian government regions no simple governorate but a corporation of self-rule of the pertaining rural and urban districts and cantons, similar to regions in the then neighbouring Bavaria (Palatinate), which had been formed after the French model départements into which that region had been divided under French annexation. Thus the district parliaments delegated deputies to the General Council (parliament), the Bezirkstag von Lothringen. The capital of the Department of Lorraine was Metz.

Territorial composition
The department comprised the districts ("Kreise") of :
 Metz, independent city (Stadtkreis)
 "Kreis Bolchen", seated in Bolchen (Boulay)
 "Kreis Château-Salins", seated in Château-Salins
 "Kreis Diedenhofen-Ost", seated in Diedenhofen (Thionville)
 "Kreis Diedenhofen-West", seated in Diedenhofen (Thionville)
 "Kreis Forbach", seated in Forbach
 "Kreis Metz-Land", seated in Metz
 "Kreis Saarburg", seated in Saarburg (Sarrebourg)
 "Kreis Saargemünd", seated in Saargemünd (Sarreguemines)

The department of Lorraine corresponds exactly to the current département of Moselle. After the outbreak of the Second World War and the defeat of France in 1940, the département of Moselle, renamed CdZ-Gebiet Lothringen, was added to the Gau Westmark on 30 November 1940.

Department presidents 
(/today's )
 1871-1872 : Guido Henckel von Donnersmarck, as préfet/Präfekt
 1872-1873 : Botho zu Eulenburg, as department president 
 1873-1874 : Adolf von Arnim-Boitzenburg
 1875-1876 : Robert von Puttkamer
 1877-1880 : Friedrich Albrecht Karl Johann von Reitzenstein
 1881-1882 : Adalbert von Flottwell
 1883-1900 : Hans von Hammerstein-Loxten
 1901-1912 : Johann Friedrich Alexander von Zeppelin-Aschhausen
 1913-1918 : Karl von Gemmingen-Hornberg

Bibliography
 Amtsblatt für den Bezirk Lothringen / Recueil officiel des actes administratifs du Département de la Lorraine (departmental legal gazette; appeared December 1870 to 1918)
 Ernst Bruck, Das Verfassungs- und Verwaltungsrecht von Elsaß-Lothringen: 3 vols., Straßburg im Elsass: Trübner, 1908–1910.
 Stefan Fisch, „Das Elsaß im deutschen Kaiserreich (1870/71–1918)“, in: Das Elsass: Historische Landschaft im Wandel der Zeit, Michael Erbe (ed.), Stuttgart: Kohlhammer Verlag, 2003, pp. 123–146. .
 Georg Lang, Der Regierungs-Bezirk Lothringen: statistisch-topographisches Handbuch, Verwaltung-Schematismus und Adressbuch, Metz: Lang, 1874
 Verhandlungen des Bezirkstages von Lothringen / Procès-verbaux des délibérations du Conseil Général de la Lorraine, Metz (proceedings of the departmental parliament sessions, appeared from 1874 to 1918)

External links 
 "Bezirk Lothringen" on territorial.de

References

Bezirk
Former government regions of Germany